S.S.D. Insieme Formia is an Italian association football located in Formia, Lazio. Its official colours are white and blue and plays its home matches at the Stadio Comunale di Maranola (Formia) since 2015. The team previously played at Stadio Nicola Perrone. Currently the club plays in the Eccellenza amateur regional division. They most recently won the Coppa Italia Eccellenza Laziale in 2022-23.

Honours 
Serie D

 Champions (2): 1977-1978, 1989-1990
 Third Place (1): 1968-1969 (Girone F)

Promozione Lazio

 Champions (1): 2015-2016
 Runners-up (4): 1949-1950 (Girone I), 1954-1955 (Girone B), 1971-1972 (Girone B), 1987-1988 (Girone B)
 Third Place (1): 2018-2019 (Girone D)

Coppa Italia d'Eccellenza Lazio

 Champions (2): 2006-2007, 2022-2023

Campionato Nazionale Dilettanti

 Third Place: 1957-1958 (Girone B)

Coppa Italia Dilettanti

 Runners-up (1): 1985-1986

Other Championships Won (6)

 1923-1924, 1947-1948, 1953-1954, 1963-1964, 1973-1974, 1984-1985

Highest Position Finished

 7th in Serie C2 1992-1993

References 

Football clubs in Italy
Football clubs in Lazio
Formia
Eccellenza
Association football clubs established in 1905
Serie C clubs
1905 establishments in Italy